Aldehyde dehydrogenase 7 family, member A1, also known as ALDH7A1 or antiquitin, is an enzyme that in humans is encoded by the ALDH7A1 gene. The protein encoded by this gene is a member of subfamily 7 in the aldehyde dehydrogenase gene family. These enzymes are thought to play a major role in the detoxification of aldehydes generated by alcohol metabolism and lipid peroxidation. This particular member has homology to a previously described protein from the green garden pea, the 26g pea turgor protein. It is also involved in lysine catabolism that is known to occur in the mitochondrial matrix. Recent reports show that this protein is found both in the cytosol and the mitochondria, and the two forms likely arise from the use of alternative translation initiation sites. An additional variant encoding a different isoform has also been found for this gene. Mutations in this gene are associated with pyridoxine-dependent epilepsy. Several related pseudogenes have also been identified.

Structure 

The protein encoded by this gene can localize to the cytosol, mitochondria, or nucleus depending on the inclusion of certain localization sequences. The N-terminal mitochondrial targeting sequence is responsible for mitochondrial localization, while the nuclear localization signal and nuclear export signal are necessary for nuclear localization. Exclusion of the above in the final protein product leads to cytosolic localization. In the protein, two amino acid residues, Glu121 and Arg301, are attributed for the binding and catalyzing one of its substrates, alpha-aminoadipic semialdehyde (α-AASA).

Antiquitin shares 60% homology with the 26g pea turgor protein, also referred to as ALDH7B1, in the green garden pea.

Function 

As a member of subfamily 7 of the aldehyde dehydrogenase gene family, antiquitin performs NAD(P)+-dependent oxidation of aldehydes generated by alcohol metabolism, lipid peroxidation, and other cases of oxidative stress, to their corresponding carboxylic acids . In addition, antiquitin plays a role in protecting cells and tissues from the damaging effects of osmotic stress, presumably through the generation of osmolytes. Antiquitin may also play a protective role for DNA in cell growth, as the protein is found to be up-regulated during the G1–S phase transition, which undergoes the highest degree of oxidative stress in the cell cycle. Furthermore, antiquitin functions as an aldehyde dehydrogenase for α-AASA in the pipecolic acid pathway of lysine catabolism.

Localization 

Antiquitin function and subcellular localization are closely linked, as it functions in detoxification in the cytosol, lysine catabolism in the mitochondrion, and cell cycle progression in the nucleus. In particular, antiquitin localizes to the mitochondria in kidney and liver to contribute to the synthesis of betaine, a chaperone protein that protects against osmotic stress.

Clinical significance 

Mutations in this gene cause pyridoxine-dependent epilepsy, which involves a combination of various seizure types that do not respond to standard anticonvulsants, but are treatable via administration of pyridoxine hydrochloride. These pyridoxine-dependent seizures have been linked to the failure to oxidize α-AASA in patients due to mutated antiquitin. Additionally, antiquitin is implicated in other diseases, including cancer, diabetes, osteoporosis, premature ovarian failure and Huntington's disease, though the exact mechanisms remain unclear.

Interactions

Antiquitin is known to interact with:
Cyclin A.

References

Further reading

External links 
 GeneReview/NCBI/NIH/UW entry on Pyridoxine-Dependent Seizures